Jane Hyde may refer to:

Jane Hyde, Countess of Clarendon (died 1725), wife of Henry Hyde, 4th Earl of Clarendon
Jane Capell, Countess of Essex (1694–1724), née Hyde, first wife of William Capell, 3rd Earl of Essex
Maria Jane Hyde (born 1969), actress and singer